Ambashtha or Ambastha is a caste or sub-caste or a community of Hindus in India. According to Hindu scriptures, the term Ambastha refers to the offspring of a Brahmin father and a Vaishya mother, whose traditional occupation was the practice of medicine. 

The term Ambastha also refers to a sub-caste of Kayasthas, now found mainly in South-Bihar, who may be connected with the old Ambashtha caste, as suggested by Crooke, and who were involved in the practice of medicine & surgery. The name Ambastha may also come from the Ameth region of Oudh or their patron deity Ambaji.

Mythology and varna status
Ridgeon mentions about the myth related to the origin of the four varnas in the Rigveda, and says that in order to explain "the great number of castes, a theory was developed that unions between men and women of different varnas produced offspring of various castes".  Regarding the varna status of the offspring of a Brahmin father and a Vaishya mother, J. Muir (1868) cites the Mahabharata and says that "A son begotten by a Brahman in the three castes [i.e. on a woman of either of the upper three classes] will be a Brahman" (also suggested by G.S. Ghurye), and mentions that "purity of caste blood was not much regarded among Hindus in early ages".

Citing the Hindu text Parasara, Leslie mentions that the Ambastha is supposed to treat the Brahmins only, and hence considered as "a clean caste, definitely below the brahman, but certainly well within the twice-born group". This differentiates the Ambasthas from the average Vaidyas, who were considered "unclean" and were denied the status accorded to the Ambastha.

In the ancient Indian epic Mahabharata, a warrior tribe named Ambastha has been mentioned. During Alexander's invasion, they had 60000 infantry, 6000 horsemen and 500 chariots. They have been described as inhabitants of northwestern part of Indian subcontinent (near Lahore), and they were conquered by Nakula and paid tribute to Yudisthira. They fought in the Kurukhetra war (initially for the Pandavas but later for Drona). They took to different professions like priesthood, farming and medicine, and are assumed to have migrated to eastern India later on.

Ambastha Kayasthas form a sub-caste of the larger Kayastha community of India. They may be connected with the old Ambashtha caste, as suggested by Crooke, and were supposed to be involved in the practice of surgery. The name Ambastha may also come from the Ameth region of Oudh or their patron deity Ambaji.

Early medieval Bengal
In the Brihaddharma Purana the Ambashthas and the Baidyas/Vaidyas were considered as the same caste in its list of 36 castes but another text, the Brahma Vaivarta Purana considered them as two separate sub-castes. Bharatmallik (17th century), the author of the Chandraprabha and Bhattitika has introduced himself as both Vaidya and Ambashtha, which indicates both the castes may have been considered as one in early medieval Bengal.

Present
At present, Ambashtha Kayasthas exist as a sub-caste of Kayasthas, the Chitraguptavanshi Kayasthas, mainly in the Hindi-speaking areas of India mostly in U.P, Bihar and West Bengal.

References

 Ambastha Kayastha (The Evolution of a Family and Its Socio-Cultural Dimensions)/K.N. Sahay. New Delhi, Commonwealth, 2001, xxi, 344 p. 42. .

Kayastha
Social groups of Uttar Pradesh
Social groups of West Bengal